Longueville is a railway station in Longueville, Île-de-France, France.

The station

The station opened in December 1858 and is located on the Paris-Est–Mulhouse-Ville and Longueville–Esternay railway lines. The station is served by TER services operated by SNCF:
Transilien line P Paris–Longueville–Provins
TER Grand Est (long distance) Paris–Troyes–Chaumont–Mulhouse/Dijon

Close to the station is the former locomotive depot and roundhouse. The roundhouse is now a historical monument, built in 1911 it was last used by the SNCF in 1967. Since 1971, it has housed the museum for the preservation group AJECTA, which features steam and diesel trains.

The train to Provins changes direction here.

Gallery

References

External links

 
 
Transilien network map
Transilien website
AJECTA website 

Railway stations in Seine-et-Marne
Railway stations in France opened in 1858